George Francis Hearne (1851–1931) was an English first-class cricketer.

He was the son of Tom Hearne and played once for Marylebone Cricket Club (MCC) in 1882. He became the long-serving MCC pavilion clerk at Lord's.

See also

 The Hearne family

External links
 Cricinfo
 Cricket Archive

1851 births
1931 deaths
English cricketers
Marylebone Cricket Club cricketers